Omega Wave is the fifth and final studio album by American thrash metal band Forbidden, released on October 22, 2010. It is the band's first studio recording in 13 years (since 1997's Green) and the first album to feature two new band members, Steve Smyth on lead guitar and Mark Hernandez on drums.

Production
The album was produced by guitarist Craig Locicero and former Systematic frontman Tim Narducci. The two had been friends since the age of 15 and together formed the band Spiralarms in 2004.
Also enlisted for Omega Wave was mixer Sean Beavan whose previous work included Marilyn Manson and Slayer. Locicero met Beavan during the 2003 recording of Manmade God's self-titled album. He learned a great deal from him about record production and expressed enthusiasm for his part in Omega Wave:

I still can't believe how lucky we are to have Sean to do it. Sonically, he's very unique and on a different level. He's produced, engineered, and mixed some of the best sounding material out there. . . Sean will make the Forbidden record sound like nothing else going, and that's a great thing.

Album title
On May 3, 2010, guitarist Craig Locicero commented on the album's title:

Reception 
Reviews for the album have generally been positive.

Track listing
The track listing will is as follows:

Personnel
 Russ Anderson – vocals
 Craig Locicero – lead guitar
 Steve Smyth – lead guitar
 Matt Camacho – bass
 Mark Hernandez – drums

References

2010 albums
Forbidden (band) albums
Nuclear Blast albums